Called Back may refer to:

 Called Back (novel), an 1883 mystery/romance novel written by Frederick John Fargus under the pseudonym Hugh Conway
 Called Back (1911 film), a 1911 Australian film based on a play which was adapted from the novel 
 Called Back (1914 British film), a silent film directed by George Loane Tucker
 Called Back (1914 American film), a silent film directed by Otis Turner 
 Called Back (1933 film), a film by Reginald Denham

See also
 Callback (disambiguation)